A bluefish is a type of fish (Pomatomus saltatrix). It may also refer to:


Other species 
 New Zealand bluefish (Girella cyanea), another species of fish
 Sablefish (Anoplopoma fimbria), a species of fish commonly known as bluefish in the UK

Computing 
 Bluefish (software), a cross-platform text editor

Localities 
 Bluefish Caves, archaeological site in Yukon, Canada

Organisations 
 Bluefish Communications, consulting company acquired by Vodafone Global Enterprise
 Bluefish (company), executive concierge service
 Bridgeport Bluefish, a defunct baseball team in Connecticut, United States

Ships 
Two ships of the United States Navy have borne the name Bluefish, after the bluefish (Pomatomus saltatrix):
 The , was a Gato-class submarine, commissioned in 1943 and struck in 1959.
 The , was a Sturgeon-class submarine, commissioned in 1971 and struck in 1996.